K100 or K-100 may refer to:


Military
 CAC K100, mini-UAV developed in France in the 1990s
 FFL Alysse (K100) or French corvette Alysse, lent by the Royal Navy to the Free French Naval Forces
 Grandpower K100, a Slovak made pistol
 K-100 (missile), a Russian air-to-air missile

Radio stations
 CIOK-FM, a radio station in Saint John, New Brunswick, Canada
 KKLQ (FM), a radio station in Los Angeles, California formerly known as K100
 WKBE, radio station in Warrensburg, New York formerly known as K-100
 WKKO, country radio station in Toledo, Ohio
 K100, former train number of Shanghai-Kowloon Through Train
 K100, radio station in Reykjavík, Iceland formerly known as Kaninn

Other uses
 Bank of Zambia K100 note, one hundred kwacha note of Zambia
 BMW K100, a motorcycle manufactured by BMW
 K-100 (TV series), a Hong Kong television programme
 K100, a former model of cabover truck made by Kenworth
 K-100 (Kansas highway), a former state highway in Kansas
 Timm K-100 Collegiate American-built two-seat light aircraft of the late 1920s

Broadcast call sign disambiguation pages